Karl A. Augustesen (born 1945) is a Danish astronomer and co-discoverer of minor planets.

Working at Brorfelde Observatory, he is credited by the Minor Planet Center with the discovery of 6 numbered asteroids during 1984–1987.

The Vestian main-belt asteroid 5171 Augustesen, discovered by astronomer and colleague Poul Jensen at Brorfelde Observatory in 1988, was named in his honor.

References 
 

1945 births
20th-century Danish astronomers
Discoverers of asteroids

Living people